Group A of the 2021 Rugby League World Cup is one of four groups in the 2021 Rugby League World Cup, which will be played in 2022. The group comprises hosts England as well as automatic qualifiers Samoa, 2018 European Champions France, and Greece, who qualified through the 2019 European play-off tournament.

The pool draw was made on 16 January 2020. The fixtures were announced on 21 July 2020.  A revised schedule was issued on 19 November 2021 following the postponement of the tournament from 2021 to 2022.

Standings

Matches

England vs Samoa

France vs Greece

England vs France

Samoa vs Greece

England vs Greece

Samoa vs France

References

External links 
 https://www.rlwc2021.com/

2021 Rugby League World Cup